Saint Theodosia of Constantinople is an Eastern Orthodox nun and martyr who lived through and opposed the Byzantine Iconoclasm of the seventh and eight centuries.

Life 
According to a biography published by the Orthodox Church in America, Theodosia "was born in answer to the fervent prayers of her parents." When they died, she was sent to be raised at the women's Monastery of Holy Martyr Anastasia in Constantinople. She "distributed to the poor of what remained of her parental inheritance" after which she became a nun.

Martyrdom

On January 19, 729, at the beginning of the iconoclastic persecutions, the Emperor Leo III the Isaurian demanded that an icon of Christ which stood over the grand Chalke Gate of the imperial palace be removed. Anastasius of Constantinople ordered that the church comply. 

While an officer was executing the order, a group of women gathered to prevent the operation. Among them was Theodosia, who shook the ladder strongly until the officer fell from it. The man died from his injuries, and Theodosia was arrested and brought to the Forum Bovis. There, she was executed by having a ram's horn hammered through her neck.

Sainthood

Following the Triumph of Orthodoxy over iconoclasm, she was recognized as a martyr and saint, and her body was kept and venerated in the church of Hagia Euphemia en to Petrio, in the quarter named Dexiokratianai, named after the houses owned here by one Dexiokrates. After the beginning of the fourteenth century, the church was renamed for her, and may correspond to the mosque of Gül.  A gate in the sea walls of Constantinople, the Gate of Hagia Theodosia (Turkish: Ayakapı) was named after her church. It corresponds to the modern neighborhood of Ayakapı, along the Golden Horn.

Theodosia became one among the most venerated saints in Constantinople. She is invoked particularly by the infirm, her fame increased by the recovery of a deaf-mute in 1306.

The Catholic Church celebrates her memorial on its original date of 18 July, while the Eastern Orthodox and Eastern Catholic Churches transferred her commemoration to 29 May.

References

Notes 

 
 
 
 
 

Saints from Constantinople
729 deaths
8th-century Christian saints
Byzantine Iconoclasm
8th-century Byzantine people
Year of birth unknown
Byzantine female saints
Leo III the Isaurian
8th-century Byzantine women